Snivel service reform was a pejorative term applied by United States senator Roscoe Conkling in reference to advocates of civil service reform. Conkling, the leader of congressional "Stalwarts," conservative Republicans who advocated the continuation of Radical Republicanism and the spoils system, used the phrase as a means of derision against reformers including Rutherford B. Hayes and particularly George William Curtis.

At the New York State Republican Convention in 1877, Conkling delivered a speech excoriating President Hayes and reform-minded allies as "snivel service" reformers. Curtis, among the targets of Conkling's assails, subsequently responded:

The phrase "snivel service reform" was also used later in 1885 by the Democratic-aligned newspaper Register of Raleigh, North Carolina.

References

Political terminology of the United States